Count of la Mejorada is a hereditary title in the Peerage of Spain, granted in 1617 by Philip III to Antonio de Padilla, mayor of the fortresses of Martos and Alhama, two important enclaves of the Order of Calatrava during the Reconquista.

Counts of la Mejorada (1617)

Antonio de Padilla y Mendoza, 1st Count of la Mejorada
Ana de Sande y Padilla, 2nd Countess of la Mejorada
Agustín de Portugal y Láncaster, 3rd Count of la Mejorada
Juan Manuel de Láncaster y Noroña, 4th Count of la Mejorada
Juan de Carvajal y Láncaster, 5th Count of la Mejorada
Manuel Bernardino de Carvajal y Zúñiga, 6th Count of la Mejorada
Ángel María de Carvajal y Gonzaga, 7th Count of la Mejorada
Manuel Guillermo de Carvajal y Fernández de Córdoba, 8th Count of la Mejorada
Ángel María de Carvajal y Fernández de Córdoba, 9th Count of la Mejorada
Ángel María de Carvajal y Téllez-Girón, 10th Count of la Mejorada
Ángela de Carvajal y Jiménez de Molina, 11th Countess of la Mejorada
Antonio Cabeza de Vaca y Carvajal, 12th Count of la Mejorada
Alfonso Cabeza de Vaca y Leighton, 13th Count of la Mejorada
Antonio Alfonso Cabeza de Vaca y McDaniel, 14th Count of la Mejorada
Andrea Cabeza de Vaca y McDaniel, 15th Countess of la Mejorada

See also
Marquess of Portago

References

Bibliography
 

Marquesses of Spain
Lists of Spanish nobility
Noble titles created in 1617